Simone Nicole Jean Lahbib Ould Cheikl (born 6 February 1965) is a Scottish actress. She is known for her roles as Helen Stewart in the ITV drama series Bad Girls, DCI Alex Fielding in the ITV crime series Wire in the Blood and Katy Lewis in the BBC soap opera EastEnders.

Life and career 
Lahbib was born in Stirling to a Scottish poet and artist mother and a French-Algerian chef father. Lahbib trained in Drama at Edinburgh’s Queen Margaret University. She then commenced her on-screen career in 1985 when she was cast in The Girl in the Picture, a film set in Glasgow directed by Cary Parker. She also sang on the soundtrack. Lahbib has worked extensively in television and film, after starting her career predominantly in theatre. Following guest appearances on well-known television dramas such as Taggart and Dangerfield, she received her first leading role when she was cast in the ITV daytime drama London Bridge as Mary O'Connor, from 1996 to 1997. Her next role in 1997 was in the third and final series of police drama Thief Takers where she met her future husband, Raffaello Degruttola. This was followed by her appearance in the 6-part comedy series The Young Person's Guide to Becoming a Rock Star in 1998. In 1999, Lahbib became widely recognised for her leading role in the cult British prison drama series Bad Girls, in which she played Helen Stewart.

Following her departure from Bad Girls, Lahbib has had leading roles in several TV drama series including Family as Jacqueline Cutler, Fallen as DCI Kate Gunning, Single-Handed as Gemma Burge, Monarch of the Glen as Isobel Anderson and crime drama series Wire in the Blood as DCI Alex Fielding. She appeared in this last role from series four to series six. She also featured in  Da Vinci's Demons as Laura Cereta, The Loch as Mhari Toner and as Debbie O'Callaghan in A Confession.

In 2005, Lahbib appeared in Red Mercury, a feature film with Stockard Channing, and has frequently appeared in films since, such as the award-winning Philomena, with Judi Dench, Wayland's Song, Film: The Movie (which she co-produced), and Burning Men, on which she was also co-casting director. She also appeared in the independent feature film Transference in 2020, which was written and directed by her husband. In 2017, Lahbib opened her second part-time performing arts school, London Arts Academy in North London. The school teaches singing, dancing and acting to children ages 5–18 years. In September 2020, it was announced that she had joined the cast of the BBC soap opera EastEnders. She made her debut appearance as Katy Lewis in November of that year.

Personal life 
Lahbib married British-Italian actor Raffaello Degruttola on 10 May 2003 in her hometown of Stirling, Scotland. In October 2005, she gave birth to their daughter, Skye Lucia Degruttola, who also became an actress. In 2010 Lahbib established the Eilidh Brown Memorial Fund in honour of her niece who died of cancer on 25 March 2010, nine days before her 16th birthday. The charity fund will benefit children with cancer and their families.

Filmography 
 Film

 Television

 Additional credits
 Long Haul (2000 short film)
 Call Me ... Holly (2004 short film)
 Ark (2008 short film)
 Zip 'n Zoo ... Marion (2008 short film)
 The Other Side of My Sleep ... Maria (2010 short film)
 Divinity: Dragon Commander ... Aida (2013 video game)
 As He Lay Falling ... Bronte (2014 short film)
 Flicker and Go Out ... Lesley Parsons (2019 short film)
 Dark Road ... Aileen (2019 short film)
 Family Tree ...Jackie (2019 short film)
 Baby Dear ...Mother (2019 short film)

References

External links 
 

1965 births
Living people
Scottish television actresses
Scottish people of French descent
Scottish people of Algerian descent
People from Stirling
20th-century Scottish actresses
21st-century Scottish actresses
Scottish film actresses
Scottish video game actresses